The 1999 James Madison Dukes football team represented James Madison University (JMU) during the 1999 NCAA Division I-AA football season. It was the program's 28th season and they finished as Atlantic 10 Conference (A-10) co-champions with UMass after posting a 7–1 record in conference play. The Dukes earned a berth as the #12 seed into the 16-team Division I-AA playoffs, but lost in the first round to #5 seed Troy State, 7–27. JMU was led by first-year head coach Mickey Matthews.

Schedule

Awards and honors
First Team All-America – Curtis Keaton (AFCA)
Second Team All-America – Curtis Keaton (Associated Press, The Sports Network); Chris Morant (The Sports Network); Derick Pack (Associated Press)
Third Team All-America – Derick Pack (The Sports Network)
First Team All-Atlantic 10 – Ron Atkins, Delvin Joyce, Curtis Keaton, Mike Luckie, Chris Morant, Derick Pack, Dee Shropshire
Second Team All-Atlantic 10 – Jason Inskee, Jason Parme
Third Team All-Atlantic 10 – Ulrick Edmond, Mike Glover
Atlantic 10 Defensive Player of the Year – Chris Morant
Atlantic 10 Offensive Player of the Year – Curtis Keaton
Eddie Robinson Award – Mickey Matthews

References

James Madison
James Madison Dukes football seasons
Atlantic 10 Conference football champion seasons
James Madison Dukes football